Mazandaran Mahalleh-ye Bahambar (also Romanized as Māzandarān Maḩalleh-ye Bahambar; also known as Baham Bar) is a village in Ziabar Rural District, in the Central District of Sowme'eh Sara County, Gilan Province, Iran. At the 2006 census, its population was 227, in 65 families.

References 

Populated places in Sowme'eh Sara County